Cryoturris habra is an extinct species of sea snail, a marine gastropod mollusk in the family Mangeliidae.

Description
The length of the shell attains 5.2 mm, its diameter 1.9 mm.

Distribution
This extinct marine species has been found in the lower part of the Gatun Formation of Panama.

References

 Woodring, Wendell Phillips. Geology and paleontology of Canal Zone and adjoining parts of Panama. Description of Tertiary mollusks (gastropods: Eulimidae, Marginellidae to Helminthoglyptidae) US Government Printing Office, 1970

External links
 W. P. Woodring. 1970. Geology and paleontology of canal zone and adjoining parts of Panama: Description of Tertiary mollusks (gastropods: Eulimidae, Marginellidae to Helminthoglyptidae). United States Geological Survey Professional Paper 306(D): 299–452

habra